The 1957 Ohio State Buckeyes football team represented the Ohio State University in the 1957 Big Ten Conference football season.  The team was led by captains Galen Cisco and Leo Brown. They were the third national title team in Ohio State football history. They were coached by Hall of Fame coach Woody Hayes. The Buckeyes were awarded the title by the UPI Coaches Poll and represented the Big Ten Conference in the Rose Bowl.

The Buckeyes finished the 1956 season with a two shut-out losses to Iowa and Michigan. Going into the 1957 season fans had a feeling of rebuilding. The feeling was made stronger with an opening loss to unranked TCU. To make matters worse, Michigan State, Minnesota, Michigan and Iowa were all ranked in the Top 6 of the AP Poll Rankings while Ohio State would not be ranked until late October. Coach Hayes rallied the team every week and made them better following this loss.

The Buckeyes came back with a big win at Washington and victories over Illinois, Wisconsin and Purdue, along with crushing victories over Indiana and Northwestern. A shocking Purdue upset over #2 Michigan State, a tie between Michigan and Iowa, and Minnesota’s unraveling season after a loss to Illinois continued to help the Buckeyes.

It was a late star performance by sophomore fullback Bob White against unbeaten Iowa that pushed the team even further. Trailing 13–10 and on their own 32-yard line, White ran on six of the eight plays for 66 out of the 68 yards, capped off by a 5-yard touchdown run.

A victory over Michigan moved Ohio State up to #2 in the AP, behind Auburn. However, the UPI Coaches' poll voted OSU #1 and Auburn #2. The Buckeyes were also declared #1 by the Football Writers Association of America and awarded the Grantland Rice Trophy.

In a hard fought Rose Bowl game, a late field goal by Don Sutherin in the fourth quarter sealed the victory over the Oregon Webfoots.

Schedule

Roster

Game summaries

TCU

at Washington

Illinois

Indiana

at Wisconsin

Northwestern

Purdue

Iowa

at Michigan

    
    
    
    
    
    
    

Ohio State played without halfback Don Clark, who was sidelined with a groin injury.

vs. Oregon (Rose Bowl)

All-Americans
Aurealius Thomas, G

All-Big Ten
Aurealius Thomas, GLeo Brown, E

MVP
Bill Jobko, G

1958 NFL draftees

References

General

Ohio State
Ohio State Buckeyes football seasons
College football national champions
Big Ten Conference football champion seasons
Rose Bowl champion seasons
Ohio State Buckeyes football